The Exxaro Solar Power Station, also Lephalale Solar Power Station, is a planned  solar power plant in South Africa. The solar farm is under development by Cennergi, a subsidiary of Exxaro Resources Limited, a South African multinational mining group, active in Africa, Asia, Australia and Europe. The energy generated here will be sold to Exxaro Coal Plc, for use in their coal mine at Grootegeluk, under a long-term power purchase agreement (PPA), between the two Exxaro subsidiaries. The expected benefits to the group include (a) reduction of the group's carbon footprint (b) financial savings on energy acquisition and utilization and (c) to provide green, secure and sustainable electricity for mine operations at Grootegeluk Coal Mine.

Location
The power station will be located in the town of Lephalale, in Waterberg District, in Limpopo Province of South Africa. The solar farm will sit on the "Grootegeluk mining complex", which employs in excess of 2,000 people.

Overview
Exxaro Resources Limited, is in the process of integrating green energy sources into its mining processes at a number of its coal mines, Grootegeluk being the first. The mining group is also diversifying into "cleaner" minerals, including bauxite, copper and manganese. Switching to solar-powered electricity at Grootegeluk is expected to reduce the mine's carbon emissions by 35 percent.

Other considerations
Cennergi, an IPP, is 100 percent owned by Exxaro Resources Limited. The IPP already operates and manages the Tsitsikamma Community Wind Power Station (95 megawatts) and the Amakhala Emoyeni Wind Power Station (134 megawatts). Both wind farms are located in Eastern Cape Province.

Developments
In June 2022, the National Energy Regulator of South Africa (NERSA) gave its official approval to Cennergi, for the IPP to proceed with this development of an 80 megawatts power station.
Exxaro, the parent conglomerate, plans to achieve carbon neutrality by 2050.

See also

List of power stations in South Africa
Mogalakwena Solar Power Station

References

External links
 Approximate Location of Exxaro Solar Power Station

Solar power stations in South Africa
Waterberg District Municipality
Proposed solar power stations
Economy of Limpopo